Bethany (Syriac: ܒܝܬ ܥܢܝܐ Bēṯ ʿAnyā) or what is locally known as Al-Eizariya or al-Azariya ("[place] of Lazarus"), is a Palestinian town in the West Bank. The name al-Eizariya refers to the New Testament figure Lazarus of Bethany, who according to the Gospel of John, was raised from the dead by Jesus.  The traditional site of the miracle, the Tomb of Lazarus, in the city is a place of pilgrimage.

According to the Palestinian Central Bureau of Statistics, it is the second largest Palestinian city in the Quds Governorate (not including East Jerusalem, which is under Israeli control), with a population of 21,175 inhabitants. Being mostly in Area C, it is controlled by the Israeli military rather than the Palestinian Authority.

Name

Al-Eizariya
The name Al-Eizariya ( means (place) of Lazarus). In 1840, in his Biblical Researches in Palestine, Edward Robinson wrote: "The Arab name of the village is el-'Azirlyeh, from el-'Azir, the Arabic form of Lazarus. The name Bethany is unknown among the native inhabitants. Yet there is no reason to question the identity of the place."

Bethany
The root meaning and origin of the name Bethany has been the subject of much scholarship and debate. William Hepworth Dixon devotes a multi-page footnote to it in his The Holy Land (1866), largely devoted to debunking the meaning "house of dates", which is attributed to Joseph Barber Lightfoot by way of a series of careless interpretative mistakes. Dixon quotes at length a refutation of Lightfoot's thesis in the form of a letter by Emanuel Deutsch of the British Museum, who notes that neither the name Bethany, nor any of the roots suggested by Lightfoot, appear anywhere in the Talmud. Deutsch suggests a non-Hebrew root, a word transcribed in Syriac script whose meaning he gives as "House of Misery" or "Poor-house".

This theory as to Bethany's etymology, which was eventually also adopted by Gustaf Dalman in 1905, is not without challengers. For example, E. Nestle's Philologica Sacra (1896) suggests that Bethany is derived from the personal name Anaiah, while others have suggested it is a shortened version of Ananiah, a village of Bethel mentioned in the Book of Nehemiah (Nehemiah 11:32). Since Greek can neither reproduce an /h/ sound nor the harsh /ħ/ sound (Hebrew Ḥet) in the middle of a word, a derivation from the personal name Chananya ("Yah has been gracious") is also possible.

Some translations suggest it is Bethany.

Deutsch's thesis, however, seems to also be attested to by Jerome. Brian J. Capper writes that this is a Latin derivation from the Hebrew , or more likely the Aramaic , both of which mean "house of the poor" or "house of affliction/poverty", also semantically speaking "poor-house". Capper concludes, from historical sources as well as this linguistic evidence, that Bethany may have been the site of an almshouse.

According to Capper and Deutsch before him, there are also linguistic difficulties that arise when the Anaiah/Ananiah, "house of figs" or "house of dates" theses are compared against the  form used in Greek versions of the New Testament. Additionally, the Aramaic  is the form used for Bethany in Christian Palestinian and Syriac versions of the New Testament. Given this, and Jerome's familiarity with Semitic philology and the immediate region, Capper concludes that the "house of affliction"/"poor-house" meaning as documented by Jerome and in the Syriac New Testament usage is correct, and that this meaning relates to the use of the village as a centre for caring for the sick and aiding the destitute and pilgrims to Jerusalem.

It may be possible to combine the Ananiah (as a personal name) and "house of the poor" derivations, since the shortening of Ananiah ("Yah has intervened") to Anya is conceivable though unattested (cf. the common shortening of Yochanan [and perhaps also Chananyah?] to Choni), whence a typical Semitic wordplay might arise between Anya as a shortening of the personal name within the name of the village and as Aramaic for "poor". Such a wordplay may have served the choice of the village as the location for an almshouse.

History

Antiquity
The site is believed to have been continuously inhabited from the 6th century BCE. In 1923–1924, American archaeologist William F. Albright identified the village with Ananiah (or 'Ananyab); however, Edward Robinson and others have identified Ananiah with present-day Beit Hanina.

According to the Catholic Encyclopedia of 1913, there have been scholars who questioned whether al-Eizariya was the actual site of the ancient village of Bethany:

Some believe that the present village of Bethany does not occupy the site of the ancient village; but that it grew up around the traditional cave which they suppose to have been at some distance from the house of Martha and Mary in the village; [Domenico] Zanecchia (La Palestine d'aujourd'hui, 1899, I, 445f.) places the site of the ancient village of Bethany higher up on the southeastern slope of the Mount of Olives, not far from the accepted site of Bethphage, and near that of the Ascension. It is quite certain that the present village formed about the traditional tomb of Lazarus, which is in a cave in the village... The site of the ancient village may not precisely coincide with the present one, but there is every reason to believe that it was in this general location."

New Testament
Bethany is recorded in the New Testament as a small village in Judaea, the home of the siblings Mary of Bethany, Martha, and Lazarus, as well as that of Simon the Leper. Jesus is reported to have lodged there after his entry into Jerusalem. The village is referenced in relation to five incidents, in which the word Bethany appears 11 times:
The raising of Lazarus from the dead – John 11:1-46
The return of Jesus to Judaea, after sojourning in a "region near the wilderness, to a village called Ephraim, where he stayed with his disciples." The Gospel of John reports that "Six days before the Passover, Jesus came to Bethany, where Lazarus lived, whom Jesus had raised from the dead."
The entry of Jesus into Jerusalem on Palm Sunday, which Jesus begins near Bethany – Mark 11:1 and Luke 19:29
The lodging of Jesus in Bethany during the following week – Matthew 21:17 and Mark 11:11-12
The dinner in the house of Simon the Leper, at which Jesus was anointed – Matthew 26:6-13, Mark 14:3-9, and John 12:1-8
Before the Ascension of Jesus into heaven – Luke 24:50

In Luke 10:38-42, a visit of Jesus to the home of Mary and Martha is described, but the village of Bethany is not named (nor whether Jesus is even in the vicinity of Jerusalem).

Crusader era
The Crusaders called al-Eizariya by its Biblical name Bethany. In 1138, Fulk, King of Jerusalem and Melisende, Queen of Jerusalem, purchased the village from the Latin Patriarch of Jerusalem in exchange for land near Hebron. The queen founded a large Benedictine abbey dedicated to Mary of Bethany and Martha near the Tomb of Lazarus. Melisende's sister Ioveta, thenceforward "of Bethany," was one of the first abbesses. Melisende died there in 1163; her stepdaughter, Sibylla of Anjou, also died there in 1165. Melisende's granddaughter Sibylla, also later Queen of Jerusalem, was raised in the abbey. After the fall of Jerusalem in 1187, the nuns of the convent went into exile. The village seems to have been abandoned thereafter, though a visitor in 1347 mentioned Greek Orthodox monks attending the tomb chapel.

Yaqut al-Hamawi (d. 1229) described it as "A village near Jerusalem. There is here the tomb of Al Azar (Lazarus), whom Isa (Jesus) brought to life from being dead."

Mamluk era
In the 1480s, during the Mamluk period, Felix Fabri visited and described different places in the village, including a "house and storehouse" of Maria Magdalen, the house of Martha, the church of the sepulchre of Lazarus, and the house of Simon the Leper. He described the village as being "well-peopled", with the inhabitants being saracen.

Ottoman era

In 1517,  the village was included in the Ottoman Empire with the rest of Palestine, and in the 1596 tax-records it appeared as 'Ayzariyya, located in the Nahiya of Jabal Quds of the Liwa of Al-Quds. The population was 67 households, all Muslim. They paid taxes on wheat, barley, vineyards and fruit trees, occasional revenues, goats and beehives; a total of 14,000 Akçe.

The Ottomans built the al-Uzair Mosque and named it in honor of Lazarus, who is revered by both Christians and Muslims. For 100 years after it was constructed, Christians were invited to worship in it, but the practice was frowned upon by European church authorities who preferred that adherents of both faiths remain separate.

In 1838, Edward Robinson visited, and described it as a poor village of some 20 families. It was also noted as a Muslim village, located in the el-Wadiyeh region, east of Jerusalem.

In 1870, the French explorer Victor Guérin visited the village. Socin found that al-Eizariya had a population of 113, with a total of 36 houses, from an official Ottoman village list from about the same year. The population count included men only. Hartmann found that the village had 35 houses.

In 1883, the PEF's Survey of Western Palestine described the village (named El Aziriyeh), as being on the side of a hill, with a ravine running down on the east side of it. The houses were built of stone. The village was dominated by the remains of a Crusader building. A mosque with a white dome was built over what was traditionally the tomb of Lazaruz. A second small mosque, dedicated to a Sheik Ahmed, was located to the south of the village.

Around 1890, Khalil Aburish, whose ancestors had officially been designated "guardians of the holy resting place of Lazarus", began promoting al-Eizariya as a tourist or pilgrimage destination. 

In 1896 the population of El-'azarije was estimated to be about 315 persons.

In the early 20th century, visitors counted 40 family dwellings in the village. In 1917, it had about 400 residents.

British Mandate era
In the 1922 census of Palestine conducted by the British Mandate authorities, the village had a population of 506 Muslims and 9 Christians, where 2 of the Christians were Orthodox, and 7 Roman Catholics. In the 1931 census of Palestine this had increased to 726 persons, 715 Muslims and 11 Christians, in 152 houses. The number included members of a Greek Convent.

In the 1945 statistics, the population was 1,060; 1,040 Muslims and 20 Christians, while the total land area was 11,179 dunams, according to an official land and population survey. Of this, 43 were allocated for plantations and irrigable land, 3,359 for cereals, while 102 dunams were classified as built-up (urban) areas.

Jordanian era
During the 1948 Arab–Israeli War, and through the years 1948–1967, the site was controlled by Jordan.

In 1961, the population of the area was 3,308.

1967, aftermath

Since the Six-Day War in 1967, Bethany has been occupied by Israel, and lands to the east of the village were declared a closed military zone, cutting farmers off from the lentils and wheat crops they cultivated on the hilltops where Maaleh Adumim was later established.

Today, the town is overcrowded due to rapid population growth and a lack of town planning. Much of the agricultural land that produced figs, almonds, olives and carob has been confiscated or cut down by Israeli authorities, or has been absorbed into the expanding built-up area of Al-Eizariya.

After the 1995 accords, 87.3% of Al-Eizariya land was classified as Area C and the remaining 12.7% as Area B. Israel has confiscated land from Al-Eizariya in order to build two Israeli settlements: 
4,217 dunams for Ma'ale Adummim,
2,749 dunams for Mishor Adummim (Industrial Center).

Many of the original inhabitants now live in Jordan, the United States, and the Arab states of the Persian Gulf. Real estate speculation and the opening of many bank branches briefly accompanied expectations that the Palestinian Authority would set up its seat of government in East Jerusalem. In 2000, about a quarter of the population, then 16,000, held Israeli ID cards.

In 2004, the Israeli West Bank barrier was built across Bethany's main road, curtailing the commerce in the strip of shops along the road, which drew both Arab and Jewish customers.

Archaeology
Archaeological excavations between 1949 and 1953, directed by Father Sylvester J. Saller for the Franciscans of the Holy Land, revealed details of the previous Christian places of worship erected near the tomb. Four superimposed churches were discovered to the east of Lazarus's tomb, the earliest dated to the 4th or 5th century. Rock-cut tombs and the remains of houses, wine-presses, cisterns and silos were also unearthed. Pottery finds were dated to the Persian and Hellenistic periods. There are ongoing excavations at a site just beyond the House of Martha and Mary.

Landmarks

Tomb of Lazarus

The Tomb of Lazarus in Bethany is a traditional pilgrimage destination. The tomb is the purported site of the miracle recorded in the Gospel of John in which Jesus raises Lazarus of Bethany from the dead. The site, sacred to both Christians and Muslims, has been identified as the tomb of the gospel account since at least the 3rd century CE. As the Catholic Encyclopedia of 1913 states, however, "It is quite certain that the present village formed about the traditional tomb of Lazarus, which is in a cave in the village. The identification of this [particular] cave as the tomb of Lazarus is merely possible; it has no strong intrinsic or extrinsic authority."

The tomb has been identified as the tomb of the gospel account since at least the 4th century AD. Both the historian Eusebius of Caesarea and the  Itinerarium Burdigalense mention the Tomb of Lazarus in this location. Several Christian churches have existed at the site over the centuries. The first mention of a church is in the late 4th century, although Eusebius of Caesarea and the Bordeaux pilgrim mention the tomb. In 390, Jerome writes of a church dedicated to Saint Lazarus called the Lazarium. This is repeated by the pilgrim Egeria in 410. The present-day gardens contain the remnants of a mosaic floor from the 4th-century church.

In 1143, the existing structure and lands were purchased by King Fulk and Queen Melisende of Jerusalem and a large Benedictine convent dedicated to Mary and Martha was built near the tomb of Lazarus. After the fall of Jerusalem in 1187, the convent was deserted and fell into ruin with only the tomb and barrel vaulting surviving. By 1384, a simple mosque had been built on the site. In the 16th century, the Ottomans built the larger al-Uzair Mosque to serve the town's (now Muslim) inhabitants and named it in honor of the town's patron saint, Lazarus of Bethany. Since the 16th century, the site of the tomb has been occupied by the al-Uzair Mosque. The adjacent Roman Catholic Church of Saint Lazarus, built between 1952 and 1955 under the auspices of the Franciscan Order, stands upon the site of several much older ones. In 1965, a Greek Orthodox church was built just west of the tomb.

The entrance to the tomb today is via a flight of uneven rock-cut steps from the street. As it was described in 1896, there were twenty-four steps from the then-modern street level, leading to a square chamber serving as a place of prayer, from which more steps led to a lower chamber believed to be the tomb of Lazarus. The same description applies today.

Other sites
The oldest house in present-day al-Eizariya, a 2,000-year-old dwelling reputed to have been (or which at least serves as a reminder of) the House of Martha and Mary, is also a popular pilgrimage site.

The house of Simon the Leper, which is known by locals as the Tower of Lazarus, is maintained by the Greek Orthodox Church.

In 2014, a new mosque, the second largest in the wider-Jerusalem area, was opened, having been funded by the charitable foundation of named Sheikh Khalifa bin Zayed Al Nahyan, President of the United Arab Emirates.

Bethany and care of the poor and sick
Capper and others have concluded that ancient Bethany was the site of an almshouse for the poor and a place of care for the sick. There is a hint of association between Bethany and care for the unwell in the Gospels: Mark tells of Simon the Leper's house there (Mark 14:3–10); Jesus receives urgent word of Lazarus' illness from Bethany (John 11:1–12:11).

According to the Temple Scroll from Qumran, three places for the care of the sick, including one for lepers, are to be east of Jerusalem. The passage also defines a (minimum) radius of three thousand cubits (circa 1,800 yards) around the city within which nothing unclean shall be seen (XLVI:13–18). Since Bethany was, according to John, fifteen stadia (about 1.72 miles) from the holy city, care for the sick there corresponded with the requirements of the Temple Scroll (the stadion being ideally  or 400 cubits). Whereas Bethphage is probably to be identified with At-Tur, on the peak of the Mount of Olives with a magnificent view of Jerusalem, Bethany lay below to the southeast, out of view of the Temple Mount, which may have made its location suitable as a place for care of the sick, "out of view" of the Temple.

From this it is possible to deduce that the mention of Simon the Leper at Bethany in Mark's Gospel suggests that the Essenes, or pious patrons from Jerusalem who held to a closely similar view of ideal arrangements, settled lepers at Bethany. Such influence on the planning of Jerusalem and its environs (and even its Temple) may have been possible especially during the reign of Herod the Great (36–4 BC), whose favour towards the Essenes was noted by Josephus (Antiquities 15.10.5 [373–78]).

Reta Halteman Finger approves Capper's judgment that only in the context of an almshouse at Bethany, where the poor were received and assisted, could Jesus remark that "The poor you will always have with you" (Mark 14:7; Matthew 26:11) without sounding callous. Ling follows Capper's thesis concerning the connection between then place-name Bethany and the location there of an almshouse. Capper and Ling note that it is only in Bethany we find mention of the poor on the lips of the disciples, who object that the expensive perfumed oil poured over Jesus there might have been sold and the proceeds given to the poor (Mark 14:5; Matthew 26:8–9; John 12:4–6 [where the objection is made by Judas]); this objection may have been made in embarrassment and may also suggest a special connection between Bethany and care for the poor.

It has also been suggested, based on the names found carved on thousands of ossuaries at the site, that Bethany in the time of Jesus was settled by people from Galilee who had come to live by Jerusalem. This would explain why Jesus and the disciples, as Galileans, would find it convenient to stay here when visiting Jerusalem. As Capper writes,

Galilean pilgrims avoided potential conflict with Samaritans by travelling south on the eastern side of the Jordan. Bethany was the last station on their route to Jerusalem after crossing the river and taking the road through Jericho up into the highlands. A respectful distance from the city and Temple, and on the pilgrim route, Bethany was a most suitable location for a charitable institution. It is not surprising that an Essene hospice had been established at Bethany to intercept and care for pilgrims at the end of the long and potentially arduous journey from Galilee. The house combined this work with care for the sick and destitute of the Jerusalem area. Thus Bethany received its name because it was the Essene poorhouse par excellence, the poorhouse which alleviated poverty closest to the holy city.

Notable residents
 Said K. Aburish, author
 Aziz Abu Sarah, peace activist
 Martha, Mary and Lazarus of Bethany, according to Christian tradition

References

Bibliography

 
 

   (see p. 11 )

  (pp. 77 -78 )

 (p. 122  ff.)

 

 
   (pp.  335-338 )

External links

Welcome to Bethany
Al-Eizariya, Welcome to Palestine
Survey of Western Palestine, Map 17: IAA, Wikimedia commons
Border Crossing: Al Azzariyah (2005)
El 'Eizariya (including Al Ka’abina) Town Profile,   Applied Research Institute–Jerusalem (ARIJ)
Aerial photo, ARIJ
Locality Development Priorities and Needs in El 'Eizariya, ARIJ
Bethany in the Catholic Encyclopedia
Bethany in The Jewish Encyclopedia 
Pictures of Lazarus' reputed tomb at Bethany

Ancient Jewish settlements of Judaea
Cities in the West Bank
Crusade places
Establishments in the Ayyubid Sultanate
Jerusalem Governorate
Municipalities of the State of Palestine
New Testament Aramaic words and phrases
New Testament cities
New Testament places